Art Institute or The Art Institute may refer to:

The Art Institutes, a franchise of for-profit art colleges with many branches in North America
The Art Institute of Boston, part of Lesley University
Art Institute of Chicago, a noted museum and higher education School in Chicago, Illinois
Kansas City Art Institute, Kansas City, Missouri
Miami International University of Art & Design, an Art Institute school in Miami, Florida
San Francisco Art Institute, a school of higher education in contemporary art in San Francisco, California